Melieria soosi is a species of ulidiid or picture-winged fly in the genus Melieria of the family Ulidiidae.

References

soosi